Świerkocin may refer to the following places:
Świerkocin, Kuyavian-Pomeranian Voivodeship (north-central Poland)
Świerkocin, Lubusz Voivodeship (west Poland)
Świerkocin, Warmian-Masurian Voivodeship (north Poland)